Lavce is a village in the municipality of Tetovo, North Macedonia.

Demographics
According to the 2021 census, the village had a total of 313 inhabitants. Ethnic groups in the village include:
Albanians 311
Others 2

References

External links

Villages in Tetovo Municipality
Albanian communities in North Macedonia